Brad Keselowski Racing was an American professional stock car racing team that competed in the NASCAR Camping World Truck Series. Started in 2007, it was owned and operated by NASCAR Cup Series and Xfinity Series champion Brad Keselowski. The team most recently fielded the Nos. 19 and 29 Ford F-150s for Austin Cindric and Chase Briscoe. On August 17, 2017, BKR announced that they would suspend operations after the 2017 season.

ARCA Racing Series
During the team’s inaugural season in 2007, BKR competed in select events in the ARCA Racing Series. With Robb Brent behind the wheel of the No. 00, the team earned one top-10 finish at Nashville Superspeedway. In 2009, Keselowski entered a part-time ARCA entry for DeWitt, Michigan driver, 17-year-old Chad Finley, son of former ARCA winner Jeff Finley. Finley won his first-career pole at Rockingham Speedway, though late race contact would relegate Finley to 15th in the final rundown. In 2010, Finley ran the No. 29 Chevrolet in a six ARCA races with sponsorship from Auto Value and Air Lift Services. His best finish of third was achieved at both Pocono and Rockingham.

Camping World Truck Series

Truck No. 2 history

Part Time (2013, 2016)
Brad Keselowski Racing first raced a third truck, the No. 2, driven by Brad Keselowski on May 17, 2013 at Charlotte Motor Speedway

On February 8, 2016, it was announced that BKR would field a third truck entry with Austin Theriault driving the No. 2 Ford F-150 at Daytona. It previously ran in 2013 with Keselowski at Charlotte. On April 28, it was later announced that Austin Cindric and Austin Theriault would run additional races in the No. 2. Theriault and Cindric didn't qualify for their races at Charlotte Motor Speedway and Dover International Speedway due to owner point standings when rain caused NASCAR to cancel qualifying. However, Cindric made four starts later in the season at Bristol Motor Speedway, Canadian Tire Motorsport Park, Talladega Superspeedway and Phoenix International Raceway with sponsorship from Pirtek.

Truck No. 19 history

Part Time (2008, 2012)
2008 saw BKR expand its operation to include participation in the NASCAR Camping World Truck Series. Robb Brent signed on to drive the No. 19 Chevrolet for three races, with a best finish of 21st. Keselowski drove the No. 19 Chevrolet himself in the Lucas Oil 150 at the Phoenix International Raceway. Using the engine out of his race-winning Nationwide Series car from Bristol Motor Speedway, he started seventh and finished the race in the sixth position.

In 2012, team owner Keselowski also drove a second truck, the No. 19, for four races. Ryan Blaney drove it for one race, and David Mayhew for four races.

Multiple Drivers (2013-2014)
2013 was the first full-time season for BKR's No. 19 truck, the races shared by Ross Chastain (14), Keselowski (4), Joey Logano (3), and Ryan Blaney (1). In 2014, the No. 19 truck got its first ever win, by Keselowski, who won his only Truck Series victory, at Bristol. Tyler Reddick ran 16 of the races in the No. 19, scoring 9 top tens, Joey Logano ran 2 races and Alex Tagliani ran the road course to fill out the full schedule. 

Tyler Reddick (2015)
In 2015, the No. 19 was driven full-time by Tyler Reddick, with Reddick winning two races (Daytona International Speedway, Dover International Speedway) before ultimately finishing second in the standings.

Daniel Hemric (2016)
In 2016, Daniel Hemric joined the team, driving the No. 19 California Clean Power/Draw-Tite Ford. Hemric qualified for the inaugural NCWTS Chase and ended the season sixth in the driver point standings. Hemric departed to XFINITY Series competition at Richard Childress Racing in 2017.

Austin Cindric (2017)
Austin Cindric was named as full-time driver for the No. 19 Draw-Tite Ford F-150 in 2017 and is running for Rookie of the Year honors. Cindric won his first NCWTS race in the Chevrolet Silverado 250 at Canadian Tire Motorsports Park in his 22nd start in the series, and only two weeks after team owner Keselowski announced the team's closing at the end of the season.

Truck No. 19 results

Truck No. 29 history

Part Time (2009-2010)
Keselowski entered the team in eight NCWTS races in 2009, driving the Keselowski family's familiar No. 29. BKR brought Mikey Kile in for six races, J. R. Fitzpatrick in for one race, and Keselowski made one start at Bristol. The team earned its best finish of 10th at Las Vegas Motor Speedway, and its best finish of 11th (Milwaukee, Gateway), all with Kile behind the wheel. In 2010, the team competed in five NCWTS events, with Keselowski scoring a season-best finish of second at Gateway Motorsports Park.

Parker Kligerman (2011)
In 2011, BKR fielded the No. 29 Ram for development driver Parker Kligerman. The team intended to run 15 races before Team Penske committed to sponsoring the team for the full season. Kligerman scored a few top fives but finished 11th in points. 

Parker Kligerman & Ryan Blaney (2012)
In 2012, Cequent Group and Cooper Standard sponsored the No. 29 team. Due to a lack of performance, Kligerman was released from the No. 29 and Ryan Blaney was brought in to fill out the remaining schedule. Blaney immediately made a splash, winning at Iowa Speedway in his third start, earning the team its first victory. 

Ryan Blaney (2013-2014)
Blaney returned to the No. 29 Ford F-150 full-time in 2013, capturing the pole at Kentucky Speedway and the win at Pocono Raceway. In 2014 Blaney captured a win at Canadian Tire Motorsport Park in his full-time effort behind the wheel of the No. 29. Blaney finished second in the championship standings at the end of 2014.

Multiple Drivers (2015)
In 2015 the No. 29 was split between various drivers throughout the season.  Cup Series driver Joey Logano earned his first-career Truck Series win at the spring race at Martinsville Speedway, and Ryan Blaney earned the team its second-consecutive win at Bristol Motor Speedway. Austin Theriault drove the truck for several races until his injury at Las Vegas Motor Speedway. In his place, Brad's brother Brian Keselowski drove the truck at Talladega Superspeedway, and rookie Austin Cindric drove the truck for two races before Theriault's return in the season finale at Homestead-Miami Speedway. 2015 also saw BKR relocate from Mooresville, NC to its new facility in Statesville, NC. 

Tyler Reddick (2016) 
Tyler Reddick switched to the No. 29 for 2016. Despite missing the inaugural Truck Series Championship Chase, Tyler Reddick won the DC Solar 350 at Las Vegas Speedway, leading the team to its first ever 1-2 finish in the NCWTS in what would be his last win for Brad Keselowski Racing. Reddick announced at Homestead-Miami Speedway that he would not be returning to BKR in 2017 to run for Chip Ganassi Racing in the XFINITY Series. 

Chase Briscoe (2017)
In 2017, Chase Briscoe was named as the full-time driver of the No. 29 Cooper Standard Ford F-150 to compete for Rookie of the Year honors, in addition to being named as the first driver in the Ford Performance Driver Development Program. Briscoe earned his first-career NCWTS pole at Dover International Speedway.  He also won his first race at Homestead-Miami Speedway in the final race of the season and for BKR.

Late model racing
BKR at one time also fielded an Outlaw Super Late Model, in Michigan, where Brad Keselowski is originally from. Australian driver Andrew Hagen moved to Michigan in 2009 to drive the car, originally from an open wheel/road racing background, using this class to gain experience in closed-body stock cars.

References

External links

Defunct NASCAR teams
Auto racing teams established in 2007
Auto racing teams disestablished in 2017